The Spanish Federation of Municipalities and Provinces (FEMP) is a Spanish association of local entities that groups town councils, provincial councils, insular councils and insular cabildos. Approximately 7,331 entities are represented.

The founding and statutory aims of the FEMP are the promotion and defense of the autonomy of the Local Entities; The representation and defense of the general interests of Local Entities before other Public Administrations; The development and consolidation of the European spirit at the local level based on autonomy and solidarity among Local Authorities; Promoting and fostering friendly relations and cooperation with Local Authorities and their organizations, especially in the European, Ibero-American and Arab areas; The provision, directly or through companies or entities, of all kinds of services to the Local Corporations or to the entities dependent on them and any other purpose that directly or indirectly affects the Federation's partners.

Foundation
The origins of the FEMP dates back to 1979, when a group of around twenty mayors started a process to increase the recognition of the local administrations. Between 1980 to 1981 those mayors elaborated the internal rules of the FEMP and the constituent assembly met June 13 and 14, 1981.

In 1985, the Federation was officially recognized under the provisions of Additional Provision 5 of Law 7/1985, of April 2, Regulator of the Bases of Local Regime and was declared a Public Utility Association by agreement of the Council of Ministers on June 26, 1985. It is the Spanish section of the Council of European Municipalities and Regions (CEMR), and is the official headquarters of the Ibero-American Organization of Intermunicipal Cooperation (ICCO).

Headquarters
The official headquarters is located at 8 of Nuncio Street, Madrid, in an old house-palace of ends of the 17th century.

Members
The FEMP maintains relations with federations of local entities of autonomic scope following a voluntary pattern, for which a protocol that specifies the relation is signed. There are 17 federations with which this type of protocol has been signed:

 Andalusian Federation of Municipalities and Provinces, in the Autonomous Community of Andalusia.
 Aragonese Federation of Municipalities, Counties and Provinces, in the Autonomous Community of Aragón.
 Asturian Federation of Councils, in the Autonomous Community of Asturias.
 Federation of Local Entities of the Balearic Islands, in the Autonomous Community of the Balearic Islands.
 Canary Islands Federation of Municipalities, in the Autonomous Community of the Canary Islands.
 Federation of Municipalities of Cantabria, in the Autonomous Community of Cantabria.
 Regional Federation of Municipalities and Provinces of Castilla y León, in the Autonomous Community of Castile and León.
 Federation of Municipalities and Provinces of Castilla-La Mancha, in the Autonomous Community of Castilla-La Mancha
 Federation of Municipalities of Catalonia, in the Autonomous Community of Catalonia.
 Federation of Municipalities and Provinces of Extremadura, in the Autonomous Community of Extremadura.
 Galician Federation of Municipalities and Provinces, in the Autonomous Community of Galicia.
 Federation of Municipalities of Madrid, in the Autonomous Community of Madrid.
 Federation of Municipalities of the Region of Murcia, in the Autonomous Community of Murcia.
 Navarrese Federation of Municipalities and Councils, in the Autonomous Community of Navarre.
 Riojan Federation of Municipalities, in the Autonomous Community of La Rioja.
 Association of Basque Municipalities-EUDEL, in the Autonomous community of the Basque Country.

With the reform of the procedure of voting of the census of Spanish residents abroad, the institutional participation in the local administration by the 2,406,611 Spanish citizens abroad is separated from the municipal elections and is channeled through its own mechanisms such as the Councils of Spanish Residents Abroad, thus generating the challenge of incorporating these Councils as other local Entities as full members of the Federation or in the case of the General Council of Spanish Citizenship Abroad as an Honor partner.

Presidents of the FEMP
The presidents have been:
 Pedro Aparicio Sánchez (1980–1983)
 Ramón Sainz de Varanda (1983–1985)
 Tomás Rodríguez Bolaños (1985–1991)
 Francisco Vázquez Vázquez (1991–1995)
 Rita Barberá Nolla (1995–2003)
 Francisco Vázquez Vázquez (2003–2006)
 Heliodoro Gallego Cuesta (2006–2007)
 Pedro Castro Vázquez (2007–2011)
 Juan Ignacio Zoido (2011–2012)
 Íñigo de la Serna (2012–2015)
 Abel Caballero (2015–present)

References

External links

Politics of Spain
Non-profit organisations based in Spain
Municipalities of Spain
Provinces of Spain